Ángel Humberto García Reyes (born 6 March 1953) is a Mexican politician formerly affiliated with the National Action Party. As of 2014 he served as Deputy of the LX Legislature of the Mexican Congress representing Coahuila.

References

1953 births
Living people
Politicians from Coahuila
Members of the Chamber of Deputies (Mexico)
National Action Party (Mexico) politicians
21st-century Mexican politicians